Akhtar Hussain may refer to:

 Akhtar Hussain (musician) (1900-1972), Indian classical musician
 Akhtar Hussain (field hockey) (1926–1987), field hockey player who represented both India and Pakistan at the Summer Olympics
 Akhtar Hussain Malik (before 1947 - 1969), Pakistani general
 Akhter Husain (1902–1983), Pakistani statesman and civil servant
 Akhtar Hussain (umpire) (died 1973), Pakistani cricket umpire